Mouhamadou Fall (born 25 February 1994 in Beaumont-sur-Oise) is a French sprinter who specializes in the 200 metres.

He finished third at the 2019 European Team Championships and competed at the 2019 World Championships without reaching the final. He also became French champion in 2019.

In the 4 × 100 metres relay he finished fourth at the 2018 European Championships and fifth at the 2019 IAAF World Relays.

His personal best times are 10.12 seconds in the 100 metres, achieved in July 2019 in Saint-Etienne; and 20.34 seconds in the 200 metres, achieved in July 2019 in Saint-Etienne.

Personal life
Born in France, Fall is of Senegalese descent.

References

1992 births
Living people
French male sprinters
World Athletics Championships athletes for France
Sportspeople from Val-d'Oise
French Athletics Championships winners
French sportspeople of Senegalese descent
Athletes (track and field) at the 2020 Summer Olympics
Olympic athletes of France